Tomás Valenzuela Confesor (March 2, 1891 – June 6, 1951) was a Filipino politician and former Senator of the Philippines from 1946 to 1951. He was served as a governor of Iloilo and later, all of Panay Island during the Japanese occupation of the Philippines during World War II.  Right after the war, he served as Mayor of Manila and secretary of the Philippine Department of the Interior under President Sergio Osmeña.

Biography
Confesor was born to a "farmer-schoolteacher" in Iloilo.  He graduated from the Iloilo High School.  He then went to the United States, which then ruled the Philippines, and worked while attending the University of California for three years.  In 1912, while at the University of California, he was a founder of a new pro-Philippine independence student newspaper called the Filipino Student.  He later graduated from the University of Chicago in Illinois with a major in municipal government and economics.  He earned a Bachelor of Science in Commerce from the University of California and a bachelor of philosophy in economics from the University of Chicago.

When he returned to the Philippines, he was briefly a teacher.  He served as supervisor of Jaro, Iloilo.v He was then elected to the Philippine Legislature in 1922 and served for three terms.  In 1933, he was appointed by the Governor-General of the Philippines Theodore Roosevelt, Jr. as the Director of Commerce, the first Filipino to hold that office.

In 1934, he was elected to the Philippine Constitutional Convention that drafted the 1935 Constitution of the Philippines and was subsequently elected to the Philippine National Assembly, the body that replaced the Philippine Legislature.

World War II resistance leader on Panay
When Japan attacked the Philippines on December 8, 1941, Confesor was in Manila.  He was chief of the National Cooperatives Association while also governor of Iloilo.   He escaped to Panay on a small sailboat.  He fled to the mountains of Panay along with his wife and children to help lead the resistance to the Japanese occupation.  He led the civilian government first of Iloilo and then he was appointed by Philippine President Quezon as “wartime governor of Free Panay and Romblon”, which includes the provinces of Aklan, Antique, Capiz and Romblon.  Macario Peralta, Jr. led the armed guerrillas on Panay.  Confesor and Peralta frequently clashed.

During the war, the puppet governor of Iloilo urged Confesor to stop fighting.  Confesor replied in what Time Magazine called a "classic of resistance literature": "This war has placed us in the crucible to assay the metal in our being. . . . You underrate the nobility and grandeur of the character and soul of the Filipino. . . . I will not surrender as long as I stand on my feet."

Immediately after the liberation of Manila from the Japanese, during which Manila was largely destroyed, he was appointed mayor of Manila.  The destruction of Manila was so great that in Manila's business district only two buildings were not damaged and those two were looted of their plumbing.  On April 8, 1945 he was also appointed Secretary of the Interior.  Also after the war, he served as the Chief Philippine Delegate to the Far Eastern Commission.

In 1946 he was elected to the Philippine Senate.  He died of a heart attack on June 6, 1951.

Positions on issues
In the 1946 presidential election he supported incumbent Pres. Osmeña of the Nacionalista Party over challenger and ultimate winner Manuel Roxas of the Nacionalista Party (Liberal wing) (the precursor to today's Liberal Party).

He opposed "parity rights", providing rights to Philippine natural resources to American citizens and corporations equal to Philippine citizens and corporations, as required by the U.S. Bell Trade Act and campaigned against approval of the parity rights constitutional amendment in the Philippine parity rights plebiscite of 1947.

Honours
President Osmeña awarded him the Philippine Legion of Honor, degree of commander.

He was given a state funeral in 1951.

See also
 List of Philippine legislators who died in office

References

External links
 Diary of Tomas Confesor published by the Philippine Diary Project

Governors of Iloilo
Mayors of Manila
Governors of Aklan
Governors of Antique (province)
Governors of Capiz
University of Chicago alumni
University of California alumni
Recipients of the Philippine Legion of Honor
Governors of Romblon
Secretaries of the Interior and Local Government of the Philippines
Osmeña administration cabinet members
1891 births
1951 deaths
Members of the House of Representatives of the Philippines from Iloilo
Members of the Philippine Legislature
Members of the National Assembly of the Philippines
Visayan people
Senators of the 1st Congress of the Philippines
Senators of the 2nd Congress of the Philippines
Nacionalista Party politicians
World War II resistance members
People from Iloilo